Saint-Gengoux-le-National is a commune in the Saône-et-Loire department in the region of Bourgogne-Franche-Comté in eastern France.

It was formerly known as Saint-Gengoux-le-Royal.

History

In the 10th century, the church of Saint-Gengoux was given to the abbey of Cluny. In the 12th century, the abbot of Cluny requested king Louis VII install a lord of the manor with Saint-Gengoux in order to ensure the safety of the city.

At the revolution, Saint-Gengoux-le-Royal took the name of Saint-Gengoux-le-National. It reverted to Saint-Gengoux-le-Royal is 1834, Saint-Gengoux-le-National in 1848, Saint-Gengoux-le-Royal in 1852 before finally settling on Saint-Gengoux-le-National in 1881.

Geography
The river Grosne forms part of the commune's south-eastern border.

Notable buildings
The church was built in 1120 by the Benedictines of Cluny. It measures 41 m in length and 16 m wide. It was plundered several times and has been heavily restored. The most recent enhancement has been the replacement of the metal bridge between the towers with a wooden one, more in keeping with the Burgundian style. In 1802, three vaults contiguous to the church were destroyed to build a corn exchange on their site.

There are many historic properties from the sixteenth and seventeenth centuries.

Transport

The railway station at Saint-Gengoux-le-National was opened in 1880 on the Chalon-sur-Saône to Mâcon railway line.

After the closure of the railway, in 1996 the 44 km of trackbed from Givry to Cluny has been paved and converted into a cycle route known as the Voie Verte. There are several locations along the route where cycles may be hired, including the station at Saint-Gengoux-le-National.

See also
Communes of the Saône-et-Loire department

References

Histoire de Saint Gengoux le Royale, Marie de Saint Gengoux le National, 2005.

External links

Communes of Saône-et-Loire